The Großer Bettelwurf is a mountain, and thus the highest peak in the Gleirsch-Halltal Chain in the Karwendel mountains of Tyrol. It is also the fourth highest summit in the Karwendel.

References

External links 

 The legend of the  Bettelwurf Ghost

Mountains of the Alps
Two-thousanders of Austria
Mountains of Tyrol (state)
Karwendel